Tyler Fermin Mahle (born September 29, 1994) is an American professional baseball pitcher for the Minnesota Twins of Major League Baseball (MLB). He made his MLB debut in 2017 with the Cincinnati Reds.

Amateur career
Mahle attended Westminster High School in Westminster, California. He committed to play college baseball at the University of California, Santa Barbara. He was drafted by the Cincinnati Reds in the seventh round of the 2013 Major League Baseball draft.

Professional career

Cincinnati Reds
Mahle signed with the Reds and made his professional debut that same year with the Arizona League Reds, going 1–3 with a 2.36 ERA in 34.1 innings pitched.

He spent 2014 with the Billings Mustangs where he was 5–4 with a 3.87 ERA in 15 starts and 2015 with the Dayton Dragons where he pitched to a 13–8 record and 2.43 ERA in 27 games (26 starts). In 2016, he pitched for the Daytona Tortugas and the Pensacola Blue Wahoos, where he was 14–6 with a 3.64 ERA in 27 starts.

Mahle began 2017 with Pensacola. He pitched a perfect game in for Pensacola on April 22, 2017, against the Mobile BayBears. He was later that season promoted to the Louisville Bats.

Mahle was called up to make his major league debut on August 27, 2017. In 24 starts between Pensacola and Louisville prior to his call up he was 10–7 with a 2.06 ERA and a 0.96 WHIP. On September 13 of the same year, Mahle pitched five shutout innings against the St. Louis Cardinals to earn his first MLB win. Mahle spent the rest of 2017 with the Reds after being called up and in four starts for the Reds, he was 1–2 with a 2.70 ERA.

Mahle began 2018 in Cincinnati's opening rotation, but was optioned to Louisville in August before being recalled in September. In 23 starts for the Reds, he went 7–9 with a 4.98 ERA. Mahle returned to Cincinnati's rotation to begin 2019. In 2019 for Cincinnati, Mahle pitched to a 3–12 record and a 5.14 ERA in 25 games, notching 129 strikeouts along the way. Mahle had a bounceback season in 2020, registering a 2–2 record and 3.59 ERA with 60 strikeouts in  innings of work. Mahle had perhaps his breakout season in 2021, when he went 13–6 with a 3.75 ERA and 210 strikeouts in 180 innings.

Minnesota Twins
On August 2, 2022, the Reds traded Mahle to the Minnesota Twins in exchange for Spencer Steer, Christian Encarnacion-Strand, and Steve Hajjar.

On January 13, 2023, Mahle agreed to a one-year, $7.5 million contract with the Twins, avoiding salary arbitration.

Personal life
Mahle’s brother, Greg Mahle, is a left-handed pitcher for the Tecolotes de los Dos Laredos of the Mexican League.

References

External links

1994 births
Living people
Sportspeople from Newport Beach, California
Baseball players from California
Major League Baseball pitchers
Cincinnati Reds players
Minnesota Twins players
Arizona League Reds players
Billings Mustangs players
Dayton Dragons players
Daytona Tortugas players
Pensacola Blue Wahoos players
Louisville Bats players